Alfatar Peninsula is a peninsula extending 4 km in northeast-southwest direction and 2.8 km wide, forming the northwest extremity of Robert Island, South Shetland Islands.  Bounded by Mitchell Cove, Carlota Cove, and Clothier Harbour.  Linked to the 1.7 km long and 500 m wide Coppermine Peninsula to the west.  The Onogur island group lies along the peninsula's northwest coast.  Bulgarian early mapping in 2009.

The feature is named after the town of Alfatar in northeastern Bulgaria.

Map
 L.L. Ivanov. Antarctica: Livingston Island and Greenwich, Robert, Snow and Smith Islands. Scale 1:120000 topographic map. Troyan: Manfred Wörner Foundation, 2010.  (First edition 2009. )

References
 Alfatar Peninsula. SCAR Composite Antarctic Gazetteer.
 Bulgarian Antarctic Gazetteer. Antarctic Place-names Commission. (details in Bulgarian, basic data in English)

External links
Alfatar Peninsula. Copernix satellite image

Landforms of Robert Island
Bulgaria and the Antarctic
Peninsulas of the South Shetland Islands